Qarah Qasemlu (also Romanized as Qarah Qāsemlū) is a village in Gowg Tappeh Rural District, in the Central District of Bileh Savar County, Ardabil Province, Iran. At the 2006 census, its population was 1,666, in 346 families.

References 

Towns and villages in Bileh Savar County